Tomasz Edward Latos (born 8 March 1964 in Poznań) is a Polish politician, who has been a member of the Sejm of Poland since 2005. Between 1998 and 2005, he was a Bydgoszcz City Councillor.

Early life 

He graduated from Jan and Jędrzej Śniadecki Secondary School No 6 in Bydgoszcz. Then he was a student at the Medical University in Poznań, currently Poznan University of Medical Sciences.

Political career

City Councillors (1998-2005) 
In 1998 election he joined the Bydgoszcz City Council III term. In 2002 election he was re-elected to the City Council (IV term) representing the 2nd district. He polled 2,274 votes and was first on the Law and Justice list.

Sejm member (since 2005) 
In 2005 parliamentary election he joined the Sejm of Poland V term (lower house of the Polish parliament) representing the 4 Bydgoszcz district. He polled 10,059 votes.

In 2007 parliamentary election he was re-elected to the Sejm of Poland VI term from the 4th constituency (Bydgoszcz). He polled 17,751 votes and was second on the Law and Justice list (Prawo i Sprawiedliwość).

In 2009 European Parliament election he is a candidate of Law and Justice (Prawo i Sprawiedliwość) from Kuyavian-Pomeranian constituency.

See also 

 List of Sejm members (2005–2007)
 List of Sejm members (2007–2011)

References

External links 
 (Polish) Tomasz Latos - Sejm V term webside
 (Polish) Tomasz Latos - Sejm VI term webside - includes declarations of interest, voting record, and transcripts of speeches.

1964 births
Living people
Politicians from Poznań
Members of Bydgoszcz City Council
Members of the Polish Sejm 2005–2007
Members of the Polish Sejm 2007–2011
Law and Justice politicians
Members of the Polish Sejm 2011–2015
Members of the Polish Sejm 2015–2019
Members of the Polish Sejm 2019–2023